Johannes Schlecht (born 27 November 1948) is a German composer.

Life 
Born in Neuhaus-Schierschnitz, After graduating from high school, Schlecht studied theology at the University of Jena. This was followed by musical correspondence studies at the Hochschule für Musik Franz Liszt, Weimar. Private conducting and composition studies followed with Manfred Fabricius and Reiner Bredemeyer. He has worked as a freelance composer since 1975.

Awards 
 1989: Hanns Eisler Prize

Film music 
 1988: 
 1990: 
 1991:

References

External links 
 
 
 
 Johannes Schlecht on Filmportal

German film score composers
20th-century classical composers
1948 births
Living people
People from Sonneberg (district)